is one of the Ōsumi Islands in Kagoshima Prefecture, Japan. The island,  in area, has a population of 13,178.  Access to the island is by hydrofoil ferry (7 or 8 times a day from Kagoshima, depending on the season), slow car ferry (once or twice a day from Kagoshima), or by air to Yakushima Airport (3 to 5 times daily from Kagoshima, once daily from Fukuoka and once daily from Osaka).
Administratively, the whole island is the town of Yakushima. The town also serves neighbouring Kuchinoerabujima. The majority of the island is within the borders of the Kirishima-Yaku National Park.

Yakushima's electricity is more than 50%  hydroelectric, and surplus power has been used to produce hydrogen gas in an experiment by Kagoshima University. The island has been a test site for Honda's hydrogen fuel cell vehicle research. (There are no hydrogen cars stationed on the island but electric cars are run by the municipality.)

World Heritage designation
In 1993,  of wetland at Nagata-hama was designated a Ramsar Site. It is the largest nesting ground for the endangered loggerhead sea turtle in the North Pacific. Yakushima's unique remnant of warm/temperate ancient forest has been a natural World Heritage Site since 1993. In the Wilderness core area of the World Heritage Site, no record of past tree cutting can be traced.

The island is visited by 300,000 tourists every year.

Geography

Overview

The Vincennes Strait (Yakushima Kaikyō) separates it from the nearby island of Tanegashima, which is home to the Japanese Space Centre. Periodic rocket launches from Tanegashima can clearly be seen from Yakushima.

The bedrock of the island is granite, and as such it hosts no active volcanoes. There are numerous hot springs on the island.

Settlements
Major settlements of the island, composing Yakushima Municipality, are the port towns of Anbo and Miyanoura. Between them is located Yakushima Airport. Other settlements are the coastal villages of Hiranai, Kuriobashi, Nagata, Okonotaki and the abandoned forest village of Kosugidani. Among the localities, there are the gorges of Shiratani Unsui, Arakawa, Yakushima Airport, Kigensugi and Yakusugi.

History
Yakushima has been settled since at least the Jōmon period. It was first mentioned in written documents of the Chinese Sui dynasty of the 6th century, and in the Japanese Shoku Nihongi in an entry dated 702 CE. It formed part of ancient Tane Province. It was often mentioned in the diaries of travelers between Tang dynasty China and Nara period Japan.

During the Edo period, Yakushima was ruled by the Shimazu clan of the Satsuma Domain and was considered part of Ōsumi Province. Following the Meiji restoration, the island has been administered as part of Kagoshima Prefecture.

In 2017, Yakushima was struck by Typhoon Noru causing one death.

Demographics and economics
The population of Yakushima reached a peak in 1960 with 24,010 inhabitants. It thereafter declined until about 1995, but has subsequently stabilized at just over 13,000 inhabitants.

Traditionally, the economic mainstays of the population were forestry and the export of wood products (principally cedar roof shingles), and commercial fishing.  Cultivation of oranges and tea, the distilling of shōchū, and tourism are now the main sources of income.

Flora and fauna

Yakushima contains one of the largest tracts of existing Nansei Islands subtropical evergreen forests, an endangered habitat ecoregion.  The only large animals indigenous to the island are red-bottomed macaques (Yakushima macaque) and a variety of sika deer (yakushika). The Japanese raccoon dog is also a common animal, but is not native to the island. Japanese weasels (Mustela itatsi) may also be seen from time to time. The island is a spawning ground for migratory loggerhead turtles, and dolphins are to be found offshore. The coastal areas have coral reefs in places, although to a much lesser extent than are found farther south in the islands of Okinawa. The island, along with neighbouring Tanegashima, has been recognised as an Important Bird Area (IBA) by BirdLife International because they support populations of Japanese wood pigeons, Ryukyu green pigeons and Ryukyu robins.

Yakushima is famous for its lush vegetation. Most of the island has at one time or another been logged (dating back at least to the early Edo period), but has been extensively replanted and reseeded since logging ended in the late 1960s, at which time a conservation regime was established. In addition, the island lists over 50 varieties of endemic flower, notably rhododendrons, and hundreds of rare endemic Bryophyta, as well as a number of endemic trees.

Climate
Yakushima has a humid subtropical climate (Köppen climate classification Cfa) with hot, humid summers and mild winters. It is said by the locals to rain "35 days a month". There are drier periods in autumn and winter, while the heaviest downpours occur in spring and summer, often accompanied by landslides. It is the southernmost place in Japan where there is snow in the mountains, often for months, while the ocean temperature is never below

Pollution
According to a disputed theory, airborne pollutants from the People's Republic of China may have affected Yakushima white pine in the forest on the island. The scientific results have been published in a 2009 paper.

Transportation

Airport
Yakushima Airport (KUM) is the only airport serving the island.  Scheduled commercial flights are operated by Japan Air Commuter, a JAL subsidiary.  As of 2019, the runway was in the process of extension from 1500m to 2000m, which would allow jet aircraft to operate and a wider range of destinations to be served.

Ferries
Tanegayaku High Speed Ship Jetfoil "Toppy" "Rocket"
 Kagoshima Port, Minato Pier, Kagoshima City- Ibusuki Port ( Ibusuki City ) in Tanegashima, Nishinoomote Port ( Nishinoomote City ), Yakushima, Miyanoura Port or Anbo Port.

Other
Orita Kisen “Ferry Yakushima 2”
Kagoshima Minato-ku Minami Pier-Yakushima / Miyanoura Port
Kagoshima Merchant Ship & Shinyashiki Shoji Ferry "Haibisukasu" [40]
Taniyama Port 2 Ward (Kagoshima City)-Tanegashima Nishinoomote Port (Nishinoomote City)-Yakushima Miyanoura Port
Forward (Taniyamako onset) after arriving in Nishinoomote Port at night Todokohaku, the next morning to go to Miyanoura Port [41] .
Yakushima Town "Ferry Taiyo"
Kuchinoerabujima -Yakushima / Miyanoura Port-Tanegashima / Shimama Port ( Minamitanemachi )

Buses
The number of bus routes is relatively high on both Tanegashima and Yakushima. They operate from morning until evening. However, the frequency of buses on each route is low, so careful planning is required.

Cars
There are several rental car companies. The northwestern road, called the Western Forest Road, is a narrow road on which it is difficult for cars to pass each other. The road is often closed due to steep curves, slopes, and occasional landslides. Gasoline prices on the island are significantly higher than on the Japanese mainland.

Railway
The last operating narrow gauge (762mm gauge) timber railway in Japan is on the island but it is freight only. Several other lines did operate but are now closed. The track is used by some hikers as a path but this can be dangerous as the line is very much still in operation.

Onsen
There are several onsen (hot springs) on Yakushima.

Onoma Onsen
Yakushima Onsen
Hirauchi underwater hot spring
Yudomari Onsen
Oura hot spring - originally a hot spring, but it's now a communal bath with boiling spring water
Yodogawa Onsen
Yunoko no Yu
Jomon no Yado Manten - outpatient Bathing

In popular culture
The forests of Yakushima inspired the forest setting in Hayao Miyazaki's film Princess Mononoke.
Yakushima is the inspiration behind the forest of Dremuchij in Metal Gear Solid 3: Snake Eater.
Fictional characters Jun and Jin Kazama of Tekken lived on Yakushima.
Eiji Miyake, the protagonist of David Mitchell's novel number9dream, is from Yakushima. Parts of the novel take place in the narrator's childhood on the island.
The island also featured prominently in the 1996 film Rebirth of Mothra. In the movie The Young Mothra swims to the island to transform into the new and more powerful Mothra taking its life essence and new powers from the eternal forest.
The protagonists of Atlus's role-playing video game, Persona 3, visit Yakushima at the start of summer break.
The first two episodes of the 2005 TV show, Kamen Rider Hibiki, take place primarily on Yakushima.
 The landscapes in Oni: Thunder God's Tale are inspired by

See also
 Ernest Henry Wilson - Wilson stump
 List of Special Places of Scenic Beauty, Special Historic Sites and Special Natural Monuments
 List of World Heritage Sites in Japan
 List of national parks of Japan
 Ramsar sites in Japan

References
Witham, Clive. Yakushima: A Yakumonkey Guide. Siesta Press. (2009)

External links

UNESCO World Heritage Site Entry

Notes

Ōsumi Islands
Islands of Kagoshima Prefecture
Biosphere reserves of Japan
Cultural Landscapes of Japan
Ramsar sites in Japan
Tourist attractions in Kagoshima Prefecture
World Heritage Sites in Japan
Important Bird Areas of the Nansei Islands